Luisa "Banti" Lloren Cuaresma (born January 18, 1955) is a Filipina politician who currently serves as the representative of the lone district of Nueva Vizcaya since 2016. Previously, she served as governor of Nueva Vizcaya from 2004 until 2013 and vice-governor from 1998 until 2004. She is the province's fourth female governor.

References

Living people
1955 births
Members of the House of Representatives of the Philippines from Nueva Vizcaya
Governors of Nueva Vizcaya
Women members of the House of Representatives of the Philippines
People from Nueva Vizcaya
Women provincial governors of the Philippines